Entertainment One Ltd., also known as eOne, is a Canadian multinational entertainment company and a subsidiary of American toy manufacturer Hasbro. Based in Toronto, Ontario, Canada, the company is primarily involved in the acquisition, distribution, and production of films, music, and television series.

This list will consist of shows and films produced or distributed by eOne and its predecessor companies.

Films

Entertainment One

Phase 4 Films

Momentum Pictures

Alliance Communications

Alliance Atlantis

Alliance Films

Shows

Entertainment One

eOne Kids & Family

Contender Entertainment Group

The Mark Gordon Company

Renegade 83 Entertainment

Paperny Entertainment

Alliance Communications

References

Content